Agyneta suecica is a species of sheet weaver found in Finland and Sweden. It was described by Holm in 1950.

References

suecica
Spiders described in 1950
Spiders of Europe